Valerie Kaboré (born 1965 in Bouaké, Ivory Coast) is a Burkinabè film director and politician in the national government of Burkina Faso.

Biography 
She was born in Bouaké in the Ivory Coast (Côte d'Ivoire).

She studied film at the Institut Africain d'études cinématographiques (INAFEC) of the University of Ouagadougou, then received a master's degree, and worked on a doctoral dissertation.

Directing career 
She started a film production company called Media 2000 in 1991. The company worked for the national television station of Burkina Faso and non-governmental organizations such as UNESCO.

Many of her films question clichéd views of African society, with a particular focus on women's rights, including standing against early pregnancy and school segregation by gender. She has described her work as dealing with heavy themes but with comedic "elements" to "get the message across more easily."

Political career 
She worked as the general secretary of the national chamber of commerce and industry of Burkina Faso in 2016.

In March 2022, she became the minister of communication, culture, arts and tourism of Burkina Faso. In July 2022, Kaboré encouraged her fellow Burkinabès to support President Paul-Henri Sandaogo Damiba's "dialogue process" following the January 2022 coup d'état. She was also in charge of communications following the 2022 kidnap and release of a Polish national. She has spoken at UNESCO on the subject of cultural heritage.

It is not clear if she continues to hold the position after the September 2022 coup d'état.

Selected film and television work 

 Born a girl in Africa - The bride was bearded (Naître fille en Afrique - La mariée était barbue) (1996), 51 minute creative documentary about women's rights and forced marriage
 Ina (2005), 25 minutes 
 Ina, second season (2012), 25 minutes

External links 

 2010 interview with Kaboré by the World Intellectual Property Organization (YouTube)
 1996 film Naître fille en Afrique (YouTube)

References 

1965 births
Women government ministers of Burkina Faso
21st-century Burkinabé people
Culture ministers of Burkina Faso
Living people